Asheboro Regional Airport  is a city-owned public-use airport located six nautical miles (11 km) southwest of the central business district of Asheboro, a city in Randolph County, North Carolina, United States. It was formerly known as Asheboro Municipal Airport.

Although many U.S. airports use the same three-letter location identifier for the FAA and IATA, this facility is assigned HBI by the FAA but has no designation from the IATA (which assigned HBI to Harbour Island in the Bahamas).

Facilities and aircraft 
It has one runway designated 3/21 with an asphalt surface measuring 5,501 by 100 feet (1,677 x 30 m).

For the 12-month period ending July 7, 2008, the airport had 15,500 aircraft operations, an average of 42 per day: 97% general aviation and 3% military. At that time there were 45 aircraft based at this airport: 78% single-engine, 20% multi-engine and 2% jet.

References

External links 
  at North Carolina DOT airport guide
 Cardinal Air, the fixed-base operator
 Aerial image as of March 2000 from USGS The National Map
 

Airports in North Carolina
Buildings and structures in Randolph County, North Carolina
Transportation in Randolph County, North Carolina